Antehiroka is a town and commune in Madagascar. It belongs to the district of Ambohidratrimo (district), which is a part of Analamanga Region. 

Antehiroka is located in a distance of 5 km from Antananarivo and 5 km from Ivato. It is traversed by the RN 4 to Mahajanga.

The population of the commune was estimated to be approximately 80,360.

References and notes 

Populated places in Analamanga